Ubaldo Duany (born 16 May 1960) is a retired Cuban athlete who specialised in the long jump. He won a bronze medal at the 1983 Summer Universiade. In addition, he represented his country at the 1989 World Indoor Championships and the Americas at two consecutive World Cups.

Later he became an athletics coach coaching, among others, the Colombian triple jump World and Olympic champion, Catherine Ibargüen.

International competitions

1Representing the Americas

References

1960 births
Living people
Cuban male long jumpers
Central American and Caribbean Games bronze medalists for Cuba
Competitors at the 1986 Central American and Caribbean Games
Universiade bronze medalists for Cuba
Universiade medalists in athletics (track and field)
Central American and Caribbean Games medalists in athletics
Medalists at the 1981 Summer Universiade